The EMF EURO is the main small-sided football competition for men's national teams, governed by the European Minifootball Federation. The tournament is six-a-side.

Results

Statistics

Performance by nations

Medal count

Participation details

GS - Group Stage 
KS - Knockout Stage 
QF - Quarterfinals

See also
WMF World Cup

References

External links

EMF EURO 2022

 
Minifootball
European championships
2010 establishments in Europe
Recurring sporting events established in 2010